About Time is the eighth solo studio album by Steve Winwood, released in 2003. It was his first album since 1997 and it featured a return to a musical style more in line with his earlier work with Traffic.  That basic style is emphasized in the three piece set of the band: Hammond Organ, guitar and drums/percussion, joined on various tracks by saxophone, flute and additional percussion characteristic of the Traffic sound.

Critical reception

Reviewing for AllMusic, critic Stephen Thomas Erlewine wrote of the album "Winwood's voice is now a little rough (which comes as a surprise), it nevertheless fits the scaled-down, relaxed atmosphere. And if individual songs aren't necessarily memorable, they don't necessarily need to be -- the feel is the thing here, and while it isn't first-rate Steve Winwood, it does feel like a welcome update from an old friend, which, after several years of waiting and several uneven records, is enough."

Track listing
                                                                                  
"Different Light" (Steve Winwood) – 6:35
"Cigano (For the Gypsies)" (S. Winwood, José Neto) – 6:20
"Take It to the Final Hour" (S. Winwood, Anthony Crawford) – 5:36
"Why Can't We Live Together" (Timmy Thomas) – 6:39
"Domingo Morning" (S. Winwood, Neto) – 5:06
"Now That You're Alive" (S. Winwood, Eugenia Winwood) – 5:29
"Bully" (S. Winwood, E. Winwood) – 5:40
"Phoenix Rising" (S. Winwood, William Topley) – 7:26
"Horizon" (S. Winwood, E. Winwood) – 4:31
"Walking On" (S. Winwood, Crawford)  – 4:54
"Silvia (Who Is She?)" (S. Winwood, Neto)  – 11:25

Personnel 
 Steve Winwood – vocals, Hammond B3 organ
 José Pires de Almeida Neto – guitars
 Walfredo Reyes Jr. – drums, additional percussion (2, 4)
 Karl Vanden Bossche – congas (2, 4, 6-8, 10)
 Richard Bailey – timbales (2, 4, 6-8, 10)
 Karl Denson – saxophone (1, 6), flute (8, 10)

Production 
 Producer – Steve Winwood
 Associate Producer – Johnson Somerset 
 Engineer – George Shilling
 Mixing and Assistant Engineer – James Towler
 Recorded and Mixed at Wincraft Studios
 Mastered by Tony Cousins at Metropolis Mastering (London, UK).
 Bonus Tracks mastered by Bunt Stafford-Clark at Townhouse Studios (London, UK).
 Artwork – Michael Rios
 Photography – Gordon Jackson
 CD Booklet – Andy Dutlinger and Mark Berger/Madison House Design
 Artist Management – Mick Newton at Atomic (London, UK); Madison House Inc. (Boulder, CO).
 Business Management – Brighton Jeffrey James (London, UK) and Charles Sussman (Nashville, TN).

References

External links
Review at allaboutjazz.com

Steve Winwood albums
2003 albums
Albums produced by Steve Winwood